Lady Anna may refer to:
Lady Anna (novel), a novel by Anthony Trollope
Keran, Queen of Armenia or Lady Anna